Irvin Neil Anderson (June 18, 1923 – November 17, 2008) was a Minnesota politician and member of the Minnesota House of Representatives from 1965 to 1983, and again from 1991 to 2007.

From International Falls, Anderson entered politics at approximately the same time that he was elected union president at the M & O Paper Company, the International Falls paper mill where he worked. A Democrat, he represented the old District 64 and 64B and, later, District 3A. The sprawling district included all or portions of Beltrami, Itasca, Koochiching, Lake of the Woods and St. Louis counties in the northern part of the state.

Anderson served as majority leader of the House from 1973 to 1981, and again, briefly, in 1993 before becoming Speaker of the House in September 1993, a position he held until 1997. He continued to serve in the legislature until 2007, opting not to run for re-election in 2006 due to health concerns.

Anderson fought in World War II as a United States Navy pilot from 1942 to 1945, earning the Air Medal for his performance. The Air Medal is awarded to any person who, while serving in any capacity in or with the Armed Forces of the United States, distinguishes themselves by meritorious achievement while participating in aerial flight. He also helped create Minnesota's memorial to World War II veterans.

Anderson died at Mercy Hospital in Coon Rapids on November 17, 2008. He was buried in St. Thomas Aquinas Catholic Cemetery in International Falls. On April 15, 2009, Governor Tim Pawlenty approved a bill designating U.S. Highway 53 from Virginia to International Falls as the Irv Anderson Memorial Highway.

References

External links

 MPR Votetracker: Rep. Irv Anderson
 "Through thick and thin, Anderson perseveres" Session Weekly April 19, 1991
 "Irv Anderson, Minnesota's classic rough-and-tough legislator" Minnesota Post November 21, 2008
 "He ruled with an iron fist, got things done and sometimes made enemies in his tenure.' Minneapolis Star Tribune November 17, 2008
 "Former House speaker Irv Anderson dies at 85" Politics in Minnesota November 17, 2008

|-

|-

|-

|-

|-

|-

1923 births
2008 deaths
University of Minnesota alumni
Speakers of the Minnesota House of Representatives
Democratic Party members of the Minnesota House of Representatives
Recipients of the Air Medal
20th-century American politicians
21st-century American politicians
People from International Falls, Minnesota
United States Navy pilots of World War II
Military personnel from Minnesota